Petra Marčinko defeated Sofia Costoulas in the final, 7–5, 6–1 to win the girls' singles title at the 2022 Australian Open.

Victoria Jiménez Kasintseva was the defending champion but chose not to participate, instead competing in the women's singles qualifying event, where she lost in the second round to Kamilla Rakhimova.

Angella Okutoyi and Meshkatolzahra Safi became the first girls of their countries to win a junior Grand Slam match, representing Kenya and Iran, respectively.

Seeds

Draw

Finals

Top half

Section 1

Section 2

Bottom half

Section 3

Section 4

Qualifying

Seeds

Qualifiers

Draw

First qualifier

Second qualifier

Third qualifier

Fourth qualifier

Fifth qualifier

Sixth qualifier

Seventh qualifier

Eighth qualifier

References

External links 
 Draw at itftennis.com
 Draw at ausopen.com

2022
Girls' Singles